Jeremias Augustin (born November 10, 1985) is a Swedish former professional ice hockey defenceman.

References

External links

1985 births
Living people
Malmö Redhawks players
Swedish ice hockey defencemen
Växjö Lakers players
People from Växjö
Sportspeople from Kronoberg County